Simone Marie Askew is a first lieutenant in the United States Army.  In 2017, she became the first African American woman to earn the role of First Captain, leader of the Corps of Cadets. This is regarded as a major step in racial and gender equality within the United States military. She graduated from West Point in 2018 with a BS in international studies and environmental engineering.

She was also named by Glamour magazine as one of the top 10 College Women of the Year.

Askew is a 2014 graduate of Fairfax High School in Virginia. She was granted a Rhodes Scholarship in 2017. Askew earned a MSc with merit in refugee and forced migration studies from the Refugee Studies Centre in 2019, and is currently pursuing MPP from the Blavatnik School of Government at University of Oxford.

References

Year of birth missing (living people)
Living people
United States Military Academy alumni
Military personnel from Virginia
African-American female military personnel
Female United States Army officers
African-American United States Army personnel
American Rhodes Scholars
21st-century African-American people
21st-century African-American women